Johnnycake is an unincorporated community in McDowell County, West Virginia, United States. Johnnycake is located on U.S. Route 52, north of Iaeger.

References

Unincorporated communities in McDowell County, West Virginia
Unincorporated communities in West Virginia